Wyoming Highway 387 (WYO 387) is a  state road that travels from extreme northeast Natrona County, Wyoming through extreme southeast Johnson County, Wyoming and into southwest Campbell County, Wyoming.

Route description
Wyoming Highway 387 begins its west end at I-25/US 87 (exit 227). The Highway heads  until it reaches the town of Midwest where it meets the northern terminus of Wyoming Highway 259 (Old US 87). WYO 387 continues east entering the town of Edgerton just shortly after leaving Midwest. At  WYO 387 intersects the eastern terminus of Wyoming Highway 192 (Sussex Road). From there Highway 387 heads in a more northeasterly direction towards its east end. At , Wyoming Highway 387 ends at Wyoming Highway 59 in Wright.

History
In 1936, Wyoming Highway 387 was commissioned to replace US 185 between Douglas and Gillette. U.S. Route 185 was commissioned in 1926 to run from Cheyenne, Wyoming to Orin. It was proposed that US 185 continue north to Gillette, via US 20 between Orin and Douglas, and via Wyoming Highway 59 between Douglas and Gillette. But the road now carrying WYO 59 did not exist. So when Highway 59 was constructed in the late 1920s and early 1930s, it carried the designation US 185. After the Great Recommissioning of 1936, Wyoming 185 was renumbered to Wyoming 387, since the route directly connected to the new U.S. 87, not U.S. 85. In 1945, the 387 designation was changed to WYO 59.

Wyoming Highway 387 was recommissioned in the late 1940s to run from US 87 in Midwest to Wyoming Highway 59 in Wright. Wyoming Highway 387 maintained this route until the 1980s, when I-25 was completed. At that time, Wyoming 387 was extended west along old US 87 to meet the new I-25. Old US 87 south of Midwest became Wyoming 259.

Major intersections

References

Official 2003 State Highway Map of Wyoming

External links

Wyoming State Routes
 

Transportation in Natrona County, Wyoming
387
Transportation in Johnson County, Wyoming
Transportation in Campbell County, Wyoming